Oxalis barrelieri, the Barrelier's woodsorrel, or lavender sorrel, also commonly called in French trèfle, oseille-marron, or oseille-savane, is a plant from the genus Oxalis. It also bears the Latin synonym, Oxalis bahiensis. It is native to the West Indies and to Central America and South America (Smith, 1985; pp. 624–625). It was introduced into parts of Africa, Ceylon, and Malesia (Smith, 1985; pp. 624–625). It is considered a weed in the Caroline and Mariana Islands and in Samoa (Smith, 1985; pp. 624–625).

The plant grows to a height of 20–150 cm and has pink flowers with a greenish or yellow base (Smith, 1985; pp. 624–625). Leaflets on the stems generally have three leaves attached to the center (Smith, 1985; pp. 624–625).

References

 Smith, Albert C. 1985. Flora Vitiensis nova: a new flora of Fiji. National Tropical Botanical Garden, Lawai, Kauai, Hawaii. Volume 3. 758 pp.

External links

barrelieri